Foster Field at 1st Community Credit Union Stadium, Norris Diamond is a baseball stadium at Angelo State University in San Angelo, Texas. 

The stadium is home to the Angelo State University Rams Baseball team.

It was built in 2000 for the San Angelo Colts and the Angelo State University Rams. The Colts played in United League Baseball and were then the primary tenants. The stadium is located on the campus of Angelo State University. The stadium can seat 4,200 fans.

Foster Field, originally named Colts Stadium, cost $3 million to construct and was built by Jim Anglea, the former head groundskeeper for the Ballpark at Arlington. It was named after Walton A. Foster, a radio and television pioneer who also served as the radio broadcaster for the original Colts franchise in the 1950s.

The field features 4,200 permanent seats, a Triple A lighting system and a Spectrum inning-by-inning scoreboard with video display. In addition, the facility has a large press box area, major-league style dugouts and a complete training and locker room facility.

The field also has artificial turf, state-of-the-art bullpens and batting cages for practice and warm-up. Concession and restroom areas as well as special clubhouse style seating areas for entertaining corporate sponsors are located on either side of the press box.

References

External links
 San Angelo Colts
 Angelo State University
 Anglea Sports Fields

College baseball venues in the United States
Minor league baseball venues
Defunct minor league baseball venues
Sports venues in San Angelo, Texas
Angelo State Rams baseball
Sports venues completed in 1999
1999 establishments in Texas
Baseball venues in Texas